Scott Shields may refer to:

Scott Shields (musician) (born 1969), Scottish musician and producer
Scott Shields (activist), American blogger and Democratic Party political activist
Scott Shields (American football) (born 1976)
Scot Shields (born 1975), Major League Baseball pitcher